Mascot was a car made by AB Rååverken in Helsingborg around 1920.

Sold both as a kit car and in finished form it was a way of converting a motor cycle to a type of cyclecar. Usually based on an Excelsior two cylinder 16 HP motorcycle (optionally a Harley-Davidson, Reading Standard or Indian) the steering, seat and front wheel were removed and the motorcycle frame was attached to a low weight body that added the "missing" three wheels. It was steered via a steering wheel, had pedals for throttle and brakes and a gear stick and was fitted with windscreen, doors, soft top, comfortable seats and a single front light. It seated two persons in tandem.

Notes

Defunct motor vehicle manufacturers of Sweden
Kit car manufacturers
Cyclecars